The Journal of Egyptian Archaeology (JEA) is a bi-annual peer-reviewed international academic journal published by the Egypt Exploration Society. Covering Egyptological research, the JEA publishes scholarly articles, fieldwork reports, and reviews of books on Egyptology. Articles are mainly published in English, with contributions in German or French accepted where suitable.

The JEA was established in 1914 by the Egypt Exploration Fund. Its editors have included several prominent Egyptologists, including Alan Gardiner (1916–21, 1934, 1941–46); T. Eric Peet (1923–1934) and Battiscombe Gunn (1935–1939).

References

External links 

 
 Searchable index of article titles (1992–99)

Academic journals published by learned and professional societies
Annual journals
Egyptology journals
Multilingual journals
Publications established in 1914